First Great Eastern was a train operating company in England owned by FirstGroup that operated the Great Eastern franchise from January 1997 until March 2004.

Services
First Great Eastern operated all stops and limited stops services on the Great Eastern Main Line from London Liverpool Street to Southend Victoria, Southminster,  Colchester Town, Clacton-on-Sea, Walton-on-the-Naze, Harwich Town and Ipswich. It also ran services on the Romford to Upminster Line and Gainsborough Line from Marks Tey to Sudbury.

Rolling stock
First Great Eastern inherited a fleet of Class 312, Class 315 and Class 321s from British Rail. A Class 153 was hired from Anglia Railways for the Marks Tey to Sudbury service due to it not being electrified, a Class 150 being used on weekdays and a Class 153 on weekends. Prior to this arrangement, a Class 121 Bubble Car was hired from Silverlink.

A franchise commitment was the replacement of the Class 312s. In May 2001, First Great Eastern ordered 21 Class 360 Desiros with the first entering service in August 2003.

Depot
First Great Eastern's fleet was maintained at Ilford depot.

Demise
In 2002, as part of a franchise reorganisation by the Strategic Rail Authority, it was announced that the Great Eastern franchise would be merged into the Greater Anglia franchise. In December 2003, the Strategic Rail Authority awarded the Greater Anglia franchise to National Express, and the services operated by First Great Eastern were transferred to One (later National Express East Anglia) on 1 April 2004.

References

External links

 
 
 
 

Defunct train operating companies
FirstGroup railway companies
Railway companies established in 1997
Railway companies disestablished in 2004
1997 establishments in England
2004 disestablishments in England